Richard Sharpe may refer to:

 Richard Sharpe (actor) (died 1632), English actor
 Richard Sharpe (scientist) (born 1947), scientist and expert in fertility and reproduction
 Richard Sharpe (historian) (1954-2020), history professor at the University of Oxford
 Richard Sharpe (martyr), one of the Marian martyrs
 Richard Sharpe (soccer) (born 1967), English football (soccer) player
 Richard Bowdler Sharpe (1847–1909), English zoologist
 Richard Sharpe (MP), Member of Parliament for Grantham in 1554
 Richard Sharpe, British ice dancer in the 2008 British Figure Skating Championships
 Richard Sharpe (fictional character), the main character in the Sharpe novel series and TV series/movies

See also
 Richard Sharp (disambiguation)
 Ricky Sharpe (American football) (born 1980), Arena Football League player